The Amazing Race 35 is the upcoming thirty-fifth season of the American reality television show The Amazing Race. It features  teams of two competing in a race around the world.

The season will be broadcast on CBS.

Production

Development and filming

Filming for this season began on October 25 in Puerto Vallarta, Mexico. Unlike the previous two seasons, which used a Titan Airways Boeing 757, this season used a Global Crossing Airlines Airbus 320 to reduce personal interactions associated with COVID-19 infections. On November 4, the show was in Córdoba, Argentina. This season also included visits to Uruguay, Colombia, Chile, first-time visits to Barbados and the Dominican Republic, and concluded in Philadelphia in mid-November.

On February 21, 2023, CBS announced that the season was set to air during the 2023–24 television season.

Casting
Casting for the season began on June 13, 2022.

Race summary

Leg 1 (Mexico)

Locations
Puerto Vallarta, Mexico  (Starting Line)
Puerto Vallarta (Plaza Hidalgo)
Puerto Vallarta (Malecón)

Future legs
Argentina
Córdoba
Barbados
Bridgetown
Chile
Santiago
Colombia
Guatapé
Medellín
Dominican Republic
Puerto Plata
United States
Philadelphia, Pennsylvania
Uruguay
Montevideo

References

External links

 35
Upcoming television seasons
Television shows filmed in Mexico
Television shows filmed in Colombia
Television shows filmed in Chile
Television shows filmed in Argentina
Television shows filmed in Uruguay
Television shows filmed in Barbados
Television shows filmed in the Dominican Republic
Television shows filmed in Pennsylvania